Listed are the seasons of Romanian football club Steaua București since 1947. Both Steaua București as well as FCSB claim the history to be theirs.

Seasons

References

CSA Steaua București seasons